Crimea is an unincorporated community in Tensas Parish, Louisiana, United States.

In popular culture
The small community was referenced in the parody news website The Daily Currant describing that American patriots were protecting the community from invasion. This was a parody of the conflict in Crimea, a region disputed between Russia and Ukraine in an escalation of situations during the intervention.

Notes

Unincorporated communities in Tensas Parish, Louisiana
Unincorporated communities in Louisiana